The United Andhra Pradesh  Legislative Assembly election of 1985 took place in January 1985 in 294 constituencies in United Andhra Pradesh, India. The elections were conducted to elect the government in the state of Andhra Pradesh for the next five years. The TDP secured a huge majority winning 202 seats. The Indian National Congress winning only 50 seats.

Results

Elected members

References 

State Assembly elections in Andhra Pradesh
1980s in Andhra Pradesh
Andhra Pradesh